Al-Zaytun (also spelled Zeitoun or Harat az-Zaytoun; ; Arabic translation: "the  Quarter of Olive trees") is the southwestern and largest quarter of Gaza's Old City. Prior to the demolition of the Old City's walls, it was one of the three walled quarters of Gaza's Old City, the other two being al-Tuffah in the northeast and al-Daraj in the northwest. Omar Mukhtar Street, Gaza City's main thoroughfare, separates al-Zaytun from al-Daraj.

History
The northwestern part of al-Zaytun was known as "Dar al-Khudar" ("the Vegetable House"), which was a small subdivision that contained the open-air vegetable market known as "Suq al-Khudar".  In 1525, Dar al-Khudar contained 43 households, while Zaytun, the south eastern part of present  Al-Zaytun, had  54 households and 30 bachelors, and Nasara, close to the Church of Saint Porphyrius, had 82 households. 

The Christian and Jewish neighborhoods of Gaza were also a part of al-Zaytun. The 5th century Saint Porphryrius Church, belonging to the Greek Orthodox denomination, is located in al-Zaytun and stands alongside the 14th century Kateb al-Welaya Mosque, with only two meters of space in between the former's bell tower and the latter's minaret. Adjacent to the church is the old Christian graveyard. Also located in al-Zaytun is the al-Shamah Mosque.

References

Bibliography

External links
Survey of Western Palestine, Map 19:   IAA, Wikimedia commons 

Neighborhoods of Gaza City